Morton B. Panish (born April 8, 1929) is an American physical chemist who, with Izuo Hayashi, developed a room-temperature continuous wave semiconductor laser in 1970. For this achievement he shared the Kyoto Prize in Advanced Technology in 2001.

Early life
Morton Panish was born in Brooklyn on April 8, 1929 to Isidore Panish and Fanny Panish (née Glasser) and grew up in Brooklyn. A brother, Paul, was born six years later. He went to Erasmus Hall High School, graduating in 1947. For two years he attended Brooklyn College, then transferred to the University of Denver "because of a desire to be on my own, to get away from the hay fever I suffered from in NY, and because Gary was there." (Gary Baden was one of his best friends in high school.)

Initially, Panish specialized in organic chemistry. He had been strongly influenced by a book he read at the age of 12, Microbe Hunters by Paul de Kruif, which left him with the impression that a scientific career is exciting; and in his final year of high school, he had a substitute teacher for chemistry who was a chemistry graduate student from Columbia University. Panish was fascinated by the teacher's description of his Ph.D. work, which involved synthesizing new organic compounds. He met his future wife, Evelyn Chaim, in an organic chemistry class at Denver University. However, he was attracted to the more mathematical discipline of physical chemistry, which he thought more challenging, and in the end this is what he specialized in. He graduated in 1950.

Panish enrolled in graduate school at Michigan State University, majoring in physical chemistry and minoring in organic chemistry. His master's thesis involved a "series of measurements of the electric dipole behavior of some organic compounds," and he did not consider it very challenging. His advisor was Max Rogers, a Canadian and former student of Linus Pauling, and Rogers supervised his Ph.D. work as well, which was on interhalogen compounds. Used to process reactor fuels, these compounds are highly reactive and dangerous, and after Panish had completed his experiments another student was badly injured in an explosion. Panish resolved to work with less dangerous materials in future.

From 1954 to 1957 Panish worked for Oak Ridge National Laboratory in Tennessee, studying the chemical thermodynamics of molten salts. Then he moved to Massachusetts and worked in the Research and Advanced Development Division of AVCO Corporation. The primary contract of this division, with the United States Air Force, was to develop vehicles for the reentry of thermonuclear weapons into the atmosphere. Panish was unwilling to do this work, but the government allotted 5% of the budget to basic research. From 1957 to 1964 he worked on the chemical thermodynamics of refractory compounds, but then decided to leave because the government terminated the funding for basic research.

Bell Labs

Before the Oak Ridge job, Panish had applied to Bell Labs and been rejected, but now they hired him. He started work in June 1964 in the Solid State Electronics Research Laboratory, a group headed by physicist John Galt. He was part of a department working on III-V semiconductors, compounds in which elements from group III and group V of the periodic table are combined, for example, gallium arsenide (GaAs). He planned a series of experiments to look into controlling the impurity elements that determine the electrical properties of the semiconductors.

In 1966, Galt asked Panish and Izuo Hayashi, a physicist from Japan, to investigate a problem involving laser diodes. The first such lasers, also known as injection lasers, were developed independently in 1962 by General Electric groups in Syracuse and Schenectady as well as the Thomas J. Watson Research Center of IBM and the MIT Lincoln Laboratory. These early lasers, mostly made out of a single chunk of GaAs, required high current densities to operate, so they could only run continuously at very low temperatures; at room temperature, they could only operate for a fraction of a second. For them to be used in a practical communications system, they would need to operate continuously at room temperature.

A solution to the problem was proposed theoretically by Herbert Kroemer in 1963 – a double heterojunction laser but failed to suggest a suitable (lattice matched) combination semiconductors. The combination of such materials used for the first CW lasers was GaAs (Gallium Arsenide) and Aluminum Gallium Arsenide. The idea was to place a material like GaAs, with a smaller band gap, between two layers of a material such as aluminum gallium arsenide (a solid solution of AlAs and GaAs) that had a larger band gap; this confined the charge carriers and the optical field (the light) to this layer, reducing the current needed for lasing. Panish and Izuo Hayashi independently developed first the single heterostructure laser and then the double heterostructure laser. However, publication of the announcement of the first room temperature continuously operating double heterostructure  laser was by Zhores Alferov in 1970 one month before Hayashi and Panish published similar results. Although there was some degree of contact between the group in Leningrad  and the group in New Jersey including a visit by Alferov to the New Jersey lab, the two achievements were obtained independently.  Panish experimented with making wafers using a new form of liquid-phase epitaxy while Hayashi tested the laser properties. Panish and Hayashi observed what they thought might be CW operation in several wafers in the weeks before their final demonstration. That had to await a laser that lived long enough for a complete plot of the lasing spectrum to be achieved. Over the Memorial Day weekend in 1970, while Panish was at home, Hayashi tried a diode and it emitted a continuous-wave beam at just over 24 degrees Celsius and he was able to plot the complete spectrum with the very slow equipment available at the time. He left a note on Panish's door: "C. W. definite!! at 24°C 10:30 A.M. June 1, 1970." A top manager, in violation of lab rules, brought a couple of bottles of champagne to celebrate.

Room-temperature lasers were soon duplicated at RCA Laboratories, Standard Telecommunication Laboratories and Nippon Electric Corporation (NEC). Over the next few years, the lasers became longer-lasting and more reliable. At Bell Labs, the job of creating a practical device was given to Barney DeLoach. But in January 1973, they told him to cease all work on the problem. As he recalled, their view was "We've already got air, we've already got copper. Who needs a new medium?"

The continuous wave semiconductor laser led directly to the light sources in fiber-optic communication, laser printers, barcode readers and optical disc drives; but it was mostly Japanese entrepreneurs, not AT&T, that ended up profiting from these technologies.

After the work on double heterostructure lasers Panish continued to demonstrate variants of the laser structures with other collaborators in work done through the late 1970s, but the major thrust of his work for the rest of his career (until 1992) was to exploit the new opportunities presented by the use of lattice matched semiconductor heterostructures for other devices (detectors, transistors) and for the study of the physics of small layered structures.

Awards and honors
He shared the Kyoto Prize in Advanced Technology in 2001.
Electronics Division Award of the Electrochemical Society 1979.
He shared the C & C Prize (Japan) with Izuo Hayashi in 1987.
Solid State Medalist of the Electrochemical Society 1986.
International Crystal Growth Award 1990.
Morris N. Liebmann Memorial Award of the IEEE 1991.
He was the first recipient of the John Bardeen Award of the Metallurgical Society in 1994.
Panish was elected a member of the National Academy of Engineering in 1986.
He was elected to the National Academy of Sciences in 1987.

Works
The following are some of the major works by Panish:

References

External links
Photograph of Panish (IEEE)

American physical chemists
1929 births
Living people
Brooklyn College alumni
Scientists at Bell Labs
University of Denver alumni
Michigan State University alumni
Erasmus Hall High School alumni
Scientists from New York (state)
Fellows of the American Physical Society
Kyoto laureates in Advanced Technology